Andy Williams is a visual effects supervisor.

Andy Williams was nominated at the 88th Academy Awards for his work on the film Mad Max: Fury Road in the category of Best Visual Effects. His nomination was shared with Dan Oliver, Andrew Jackson, and Tom Wood.

References

External links

Living people
Special effects people
Year of birth missing (living people)
Place of birth missing (living people)